Results of India national football team from 1933–1959.

1938

1948

1951

1952

1953

1954

1955

1956

1958

1959

See also
India national football team results (1960–1969)
History of the India national football team
India national football team records and statistics

References

1933
1930s in Indian sport
1940s in Indian sport
1950s in Indian sport